Costantino Mario dei Principi Ruspoli (born 29 June 1971), son of Marcantonio Mario Dimitri Ruspoli, 3rd Prince of Poggio Suasa, and his second wife Gleide Portela Chagas (1935–2002), is the 4th Principe di Poggio Suasa and Prince of the Holy Roman Empire.

Marriage 
At Londrina, Paraná, on 29 October 1994, he married Vera Cristina Comar (born 28 October 1974). They divorced on 3 November 1999 without issue.

Decorations 
 Commander of the Sovereign Order of Fraternal Integration Italo/Brazilian.
 Honorary Member of the Itapirense Academy of Letters and Arts (AILA).

Cultural and charitable interests 
 Brazilian Federation for Human Rights.

See also 
 Ruspoli

References

External links 
 Costantino Mario Ruspoli on a genealogical site

1971 births
Living people
Costantino
Italian nobility